Gobernador Virasoro (formally Gobernador Ingeniero Valentín Virasoro) is a city in the province of Corrientes in the Argentine Mesopotamia.

The city lies in the north-east of the province, 64 km north from the city of Santo Tomé and 90 km from Posadas, Misiones, on National Route 14. The Iberá Wetlands are located 80 km to the west.

Gobernador Virasoro as such was founded on 23 September 1926. The original settlement, called Villa Vuelta del Ombú since the time the Jesuits established a ranch there, was renamed in homage to Valentín Virasoro, a field engineer who measured terrains and studied the Iberá lagoon and wetlands working for the provincial government.

References

 
 VirasoroWeb.com.ar - Portal of the city.

Populated places in Corrientes Province
Cities in Argentina
Argentina
Corrientes Province